The Moodys Christmas may refer to:

A Moody Christmas, an Australian television special
The Moodys, an American television series